John Dudley North (1893–1968), CBE, HonFRAeS, MIMechE, was Chairman and Managing Director of Boulton Paul Aircraft.

Born in 1893 and educated at Bedford School, North became Chief Engineer for Claude Graham-White of the Grahame-White Aviation Co. Ltd., before the onset of World War I. This was a very responsible post for a young man in a young company within a fledgling and vital industry. He moved on in 1915 to become superintendent of the aviation department of Austin Motor Company. In 1917 he joined Boulton Paul in Norwich and commenced his long association with the company and its aircraft division, Boulton Paul Aircraft. Mr North rose to the position of managing director of Boulton Paul Aircraft and was also the company’s chief engineer. He retired in 1954.

During North’s time with Boulton Paul he was involved in the design of many aircraft, not least the Overstrand, Sidestrand, Defiant and the R101 airship, of which the company built the hull.

In 1941 North was Vice President of the Society of British Aerospace Companies (SBAC). He was made an honorary fellow of the Royal Aeronautical Society in May 1961 and he made CBE in 1962.

John Dudley North died on 13 January 1968 in Bridgnorth, Shropshire, aged 75.

References 

1893 births
1968 deaths
Aircraft designers
Boulton Paul aircraft
People from Bridgnorth
Commanders of the Order of the British Empire
People educated at Bedford School